Carex tenuiflora, the sparse-flowered sedge, is a species of flowering plant in the family Cyperaceae. It is native to the Subarctic and Hemiboreal Northern Hemisphere; Alaska, Canada, the northern US, Scandinavia, the Baltic States, all of Russia, the north Caucasus, Siberia, the Russian Far East, Mongolia, northern China, Korea, and Japan. It is most often found in peatlands, preferring a pH of 6.

References

tenuiflora
Flora of Norway
Flora of Sweden
Flora of Finland
Flora of the Baltic states
Flora of Russia
Flora of the North Caucasus
Flora of Siberia
Flora of the Russian Far East
Flora of Mongolia
Flora of Inner Mongolia
Flora of Manchuria
Flora of Korea
Flora of Japan
Flora of Alaska
Flora of the Northwest Territories
Flora of Nunavut
Flora of Yukon
Flora of Western Canada
Flora of Eastern Canada
Flora of Montana
Flora of Colorado
Flora of Minnesota
Flora of Wisconsin
Flora of Michigan
Flora of New York (state)
Flora of Massachusetts
Flora of Vermont
Flora of Maine
Plants described in 1803
Flora without expected TNC conservation status